Attraction may refer to:

 Interpersonal attraction, the attraction between people which leads to friendships, platonic and romantic relationships
 Physical attractiveness, attraction on the basis of beauty
 Sexual attraction
 Object or event that is attractive
 Tourist attraction, a place of interest where tourists visit
 Amusement park attraction
Attraction in physics
 Electromagnetic attraction
 Magnetism
 Gravity
 Strong nuclear force
 Weak nuclear force

Other uses
 Attraction basin (a.k.a. attractor), in dynamical systems
 Attraction (grammar), the process by which a relative pronoun takes on the case of its antecedent
 Attraction (horse) (foaled 2001)
 Attraction (2017 film), a Russian science fiction action film focusing upon an extraterrestrial spaceship crash-landing
 Attraction (2018 film), a Bulgarian romantic comedy film

See also
 Attractive nuisance doctrine 
 Attract (disambiguation)
 Law of attraction (disambiguation)